Sedimentation is the deposition of sediments. It takes place when particles in suspension settle out of the fluid in which they are entrained and come to rest against a barrier. This is due to their motion through the fluid in response to the forces acting on them: these forces can be due to gravity, centrifugal acceleration, or electromagnetism. Settling is the falling of suspended particles through the liquid, whereas sedimentation is the final result of the settling process.

In geology, sedimentation is the deposition of sediments which results in the formation of sedimentary rock. The term is broadly applied to the entire range of processes that result in the formation of sedimentary rock, from initial erosion through sediment transport and settling to the lithification of the sediments. However, the strict geological definition of sedimentation is the mechanical deposition of sediment particles from an initial suspension in air or water.

Sedimentation may pertain to objects of various sizes, ranging from large rocks in flowing water, to suspensions of dust and pollen particles, to cellular suspensions, to solutions of single molecules such as proteins and peptides.  Even small molecules supply a sufficiently strong force to produce significant sedimentation.

Geology

In geology, the term sedimentation is broadly applied to the entire range of processes that result in the formation of sedimentary rock, from initial formation of sediments by erosion of particles from rock outcrops, through sediment transport and settling, to the lithification of the sediments. However, the term is more particularly applied to the deposition of sediments, and in the strictest sense, it applies only to the mechanical deposition of sediment particles from an initial suspension in air or water. Sedimentation results in the formation of depositional landforms and the rocks that constitute the sedimentary record.  The building up of land surfaces by sedimentation, particularly in river valleys, is called aggradation.

The rate of sedimentation is the thickness of sediment accumulated per unit time. For suspended load, this can be expressed mathematically by the Exner equation. However, long-term accumulation of sediments is determined less by rate of sedimentation than by rate of subsidence, which creates accommodation space for sediments to accumulate over geological time scales. Most sedimentation in the geologic record occurred in relative brief depositional episodes separated by long intervals of nondeposition or even erosion.

An undesired increased transport and sedimentation of suspended material is called siltation, and it is a major source of pollution in waterways in some parts of the world. High sedimentation rates can be a result of poor land management and a high frequency of flooding events. If not managed properly, it can be detrimental to fragile ecosystems on the receiving end, such as coral reefs. Climate change also affects siltation rates.

In estuarine environments, settling can be influenced by the presence or absence of vegetation. Trees such as mangroves are crucial to the attenuation of waves or currents, promoting the settlement of suspended particles.

Human-enhanced sedimentation

Chemistry
In chemistry, sedimentation has been used to measure the size of large molecules (macromolecule), where the force of gravity is augmented with centrifugal force in an ultracentrifuge.

Sedimentation equilibrium

When particles settling from a suspension reach a hard boundary, the concentration of particles at the boundary is opposed by the diffusion of the particles. The distribution of sediment near the boundary comes into sedimentation equilibrium. Measurements of the distribution yields information on the nature of the particles.

Classification
Classification of sedimentation:
Type 1 sedimentation is characterized by particles that settle discretely at a constant settling velocity, or by the deposition of Iron-Rich minerals to streamlines down to the point source. They settle as individual particles and do not flocculate (stick to each other) during settling.  Example: sand and grit material
Type 2 sedimentation is characterized by particles that flocculate during sedimentation and because of this their size is constantly changing and therefore their settling velocity is changing.  Example: alum or iron coagulation
Type 3 sedimentation is also known as zone sedimentation. In this process the particles are at a high concentration (greater than 1000 mg/L) such that the particles tend to settle as a mass and a distinct clear zone and sludge zone are present. Zone settling occurs in lime-softening, sedimentation, active sludge sedimentation and sludge thickeners.

See also

Notes

Earth sciences
Laboratory techniques
Liquid-solid separation